Pierre Ruby (born 20 September 1932) is a French former professional racing cyclist. He rode in five editions of the Tour de France.

References

External links
 

1932 births
Living people
French male cyclists
People from Bron
Sportspeople from Lyon Metropolis
Cyclists from Auvergne-Rhône-Alpes